Oswald "O.K." Smathers (born 26 August 1914 in Asheville, North Carolina, United States; died 5 May 1997 in Brevard, North Carolina, United States) was a national and World Champion archer who represented the United States.

Smathers was not selected for the United States representation at the 1957 World Archery Championships in Prague, Czechoslovakia, which was the first championships to which the US sent a full team, but paid his own expenses to attend. He went on to win the men's championships in the most successful ever World Archery Championships for the United States, winning all three medals in both men's and women's competitions and both team championships, a record that has not been matched since. Smathers became the first US world champion since Donald MacKenzie in 1933. He competed again in 1958 and 1959, finishing 16th and 6th respectively.

After winning the World Championships, Smathers as well as his daughter and son appeared on game show I've Got A Secret as a celebrity guests, along with his family. His daughter Lynne and son Ken were also archery champions; both won national championships the same year their father won the world championships, 1957. Ken won the North Carolina state championships in 1961.

References

American male archers
1914 births
1997 deaths
World Archery Championships medalists